Now That's What I Call Music! 6 refers to at least two different "Now That's What I Call Music!"-series albums, including
 Now That's What I Call Music 6 (UK series), 1985
 Now That's What I Call Music! 6 (U.S. series), 2001